"Diva Single Version" is the 47th single by Japanese entertainer Akina Nakamori. Written by Ryohei Matsufuji, Philippe-Marc Anquetil, Chris Lee-Joe, and Emma Rohan, the single was released on September 23, 2009, by Universal Sigma. It was also the lead single from her 23nd studio album Diva.

Background 
"Diva Single Version" was Nakamori's first single in three years, after the 2005 release "Hana yo Odore". The first B-side "Heartbreak" is the original mix of the song included in the album Diva, while the second B-side "I Hope So" is a remastered version of the title track from Nakamori's 2003 album I Hope So.

Chart performance 
"Diva Single Version" peaked at No. 50 on Oricon's weekly singles chart and sold over 1,600 copies, becoming Nakamori's lowest-selling single.

Track listing

Personnel 
"I Hope So"
 Hirokazu Ogura – electric guitar
 Yoshiaki Kanō – acoustic guitar
 Chiharu Mikuzuki – bass
 Toshiya Matsunaga – drums
 Satoshi Takebe – keyboards
 Masafumi Yamanaka – synthesizers, programming

Charts

References

External links 
 
 
 

2009 singles
2009 songs
Akina Nakamori songs
Japanese-language songs
Universal Sigma singles